USS Cape St. George (CG-71) is a Ticonderoga-class cruiser laid down by the Litton-Ingalls Shipbuilding Corporation at Pascagoula, Mississippi, on 19 November 1990, launched on 10 January 1992, and commissioned on 12 June 1993. Cape St. George operates out of San Diego, California, and administratively reports to the Commander, Naval Surface Forces Pacific.

Name
Cape St. George is named for the World War II Battle of Cape St. George near New Ireland in Papua New Guinea, where a U.S. Navy destroyer force led by Captain Arleigh Burke defeated a Japanese destroyer force on 25 November 1943.

History
In March 2003, she was a first responder in support of Operation Iraqi Freedom, awaiting orders from the Mediterranean Sea, off the coast of Turkey. She was part of Cruiser-Destroyer Group 8. The helicopter squadron attached to the ship during this cruise was HSL-44 (out of Mayport Naval Station). During this deployment, the Cape St. George became one of the first US Navy ships to fire cruise missiles from the Mediterranean at a target (Iraq). The Cape soon set sail for the Persian Gulf to continue missile-support operations after the government of Turkey claimed that a cruise missile landed, intact, on Turkish soil, resulting in US warships being forbidden from firing missiles over Turkish airspace. The Cape St. George then became the first US Navy ship ever to fire from two theaters of battle in history during her five-month cruise, the Mediterranean Sea and the Persian Gulf. The photograph of the USS Cape St. George firing its first missile at Iraq from the Mediterranean Sea was taken by one of two sailors deployed in one of the Cape's two rigid-hull inflatable boats. Video footage was also taken and was seen shortly after on CNN. The photograph made newspapers nationwide soon after and is now the Cape's token photograph.

In May 2005, Cape St. George became the first surface warship certified to use only digital nautical charts, instead of paper charts using the Voyage Management System (VMS). About 12,000 paper charts have been replaced by 29 computer discs.  VMS is part of the Smart Ship Integrated Bridge System, which has been under development since 1990.

Initial reports indicated that one suspected pirate was killed and five others wounded, while Cape St. George took superficial damage from small-arms fire during the action.

In March 2007, Seaman Richard Mott slashed the throat of Seaman Jose Garcia from behind as the 18-year-old ate breakfast on the berthing barge nested aside the ship, while she was pierside at BAE Shipyards Norfolk, Virginia, for repairs.  Garcia was seriously injured, but survived.  On 7 November 2008, Mott was found guilty of attempted murder and was sentenced to 12 years in prison.

In July 2007, Cape St. George departed Norfolk in transit to her new homeport of San Diego, California as part of the realignment of naval forces following the 2006 Quadrennial Defense Review.

On 17 October 2010, the aircraft carrier  and Cape St. George arrived off the coast of Pakistan to support the coalition troop surge in landlocked Afghanistan.

On 31 January 2011, Cape St. George responded to a distress call from a sinking Iranian dhow by dispatching a rescue team via a rigid-hulled inflatable boat.  The rescue team attempted to repair the dhow's bilge pumps, but they were unable to stop the flooding. The Iranian fishermen were brought aboard Cape St. George, where they were examined by the medical staff before being transferred to an Iranian customs vessel.

On 6–10 January 2012, accompanying carrier Abraham Lincoln, Cape St. George visited the Gulf of Thailand port of Laem Chabang.  During the visit, Singapore-based Glenn Defense Marine Asia (GDMA) provided husbanding services, for which the Navy was billed a total of $884,000. In November 2013, federal prosecutors charged that the Navy had been overbilled more than $500,000.

Awards

Navy Unit Commendation - (Mar 1994-Apr 1995, May 2000 – May 2001, Nov 2005-May 2006, Dec 2011-Aug 2012)
 Navy Meritorious Unit Commendation (Jun-Dec 1998, Sep 2010-Mar 2011)
Navy E Ribbon - (1993, 1994, 1997, 1998, 2000, 2002, 2015)
 James F. Chezek Memorial Gunnery Award - (1996, 1998)
 USS ARIZONA Memorial Trophy - (1995)
 SIXTH Fleet "Hook 'Em" award for Anti-Submarine Warfare excellence - (1995)

References

External links
 

 

Ticonderoga-class cruisers
Ships built in Pascagoula, Mississippi
1992 ships
Cruisers of the United States